Leandro Viotto Romano (28 September 1985 in Buenos Aires) is an Argentinian entrepreneur. He is the founder and executive director of the internacional foundation of young leaders.

Biography 
Leandro Viotto is a young entrepreneur of Argentine nationality. He founded, among others, the "International Young Leaders Foundation", the International Young Leaders Summit and the social app "All x All".

Within his obligations, he is in charge of management and administrative direction in Young Leaders. Responsible for the long-term organizational strategy in the countries where the Foundation is present, and oversees operations of the institution locally and internationally. He has also served as technical advisor to the Honorable Chamber of Deputies of the Argentine Nation.

He received, among other distinctions, the Keys of the City of Miami, the medal of "Illustrious Visitor" by the Mayor of Pachuca, Mexico; the "young international leader" award in 2008 in Vitacura, Chile; the bronze medal for merit by the Universita Degli Studio di Roma in 2012 and in 2014 the Junior Chamber International distinguished him as one of the 10 outstanding young people of Argentina. The Capitol of Puerto Rico, after a vote of its chambers of representatives, granted him a special recognition while the Mayor of Cataño honored him with the "Keys of the City". In 2015 the Government of Mazatlan, Sinaloa, declared it "distinguished guest" of the City and that same year Dr. Jose Aybar, former Minister of Education and rector of the University of the Caribbean, in the Dominican Republic, recognized him "for outstanding contributions to the training of young people who contribute to the social change of nations. " In turn, the Anáhuac University and the CRS (Center for Social Responsibility) awarded the CLARES award for Social Responsibility in the category of international organization in Mexico, for the tasks carried out within the framework of the International Young Leaders Foundation.

Two of his books are, "The right not to be poor" and "What the 30 leave me."

Book: The voices of success 
In 2010 published the book "Voices of Success", where entrepreneurs and intellectuals working with this test, as it says in the subtitle says "that way succeed and change the world at once." Their goal: To spread ideas in the world of the foundation. It is an essay that rescues exclusively the views of business personalities as Google CEO for Latin America, Microsoft LATAM CEO, Deloitte executives, Macdonalds, Mercadolibre.com, Skanska, Nextel and OLX. In addition, the work has the strong opinions of intellectuals as Marcos Aguinis, Monica Cavallé, Alvaro Vargas Llosa and Yoani Sanchez, among others. Today the book can be downloaded for free.

Awards 
In 2008, he was awarded "International Young Leader" award from the NGO "New Leaders" in the city of Vitacura, Chile.

In August 2012, he was awarded the bronze medal CICSI It is awarded by the Foro Italico Universita Degli the Studio Di Roma Comitato jointly with Internazionale per la Cooperazione Allo Sviluppo.

 Various artists, intellectuals and businessmen as Amalia Lacroze de Fortabat, Shakira, Klaus Schwab, Rafa Nadal, Margarita Cedeño and Pilar Rahola, among others, in the world have recognized the work of Leandro Viotto Romano.
 Key to the City of Miami. Januari 2013

References

External links 
 International Foundation of Young Leaders (Spanish)

1985 births
Living people
Argentine businesspeople